Dominic John Thornely (born 1 October 1978) is an Australian former first-class cricketer who played for the New South Wales cricket team in Australian domestic cricket.

Thornely made his debut for New South Wales aged 25 and made his maiden first-class century with 143 against Victoria at Newcastle. He went on to receive Australia A selection in his debut season. He held an Australian Cricket Academy scholarship in 1997.

He had an outstanding 2004–05 series in the Pura Cup scoring 1065 runs at 62.65 with 4 centuries, helping NSW to win the competition. His highest score of 261 was made against Western Australia at the SCG and in it he beat the record of David Hookes for most sixes in an Australian domestic game with 11. Another record came in his 219-run stand for the last wicket with Stuart MacGill. MacGill only contributed 27 of those runs.

He played county cricket with Surrey in 2005 and for Hampshire in 2007. He represented Mumbai Indians in the Indian Premier League 2008 season.

References

External links

1978 births
Living people
Australian cricketers
New South Wales cricketers
Surrey cricketers
Hampshire cricketers
Sportspeople from Albury
Mumbai Indians cricketers
Australian Institute of Sport cricketers
Sydney Sixers cricketers
Cricketers from New South Wales